"Minutos" is a latin pop song written by Guatemalan latin pop singer-songwriter Ricardo Arjona for his ninth studio album, Santo Pecado (2002). The song was released as the second single from the album.

Music video 
The music video for "Minutos" was filmed in Argentina, on the Caseros prison, actually unused. It was filmed in two days, and in it, Arjona can be seen "playing basketball with the other recruits, doing exercise on an improvised gym, and thinking on the days he lived with his wife."

Trackslisting

Charts

Release history

References 

2003 songs
Ricardo Arjona songs
Songs written by Ricardo Arjona